is a Japanese hentai manga written and illustrated by Tokihara Masato.  It was published in English by Digital Manga, who chose to remove a chapter for legal reasons.

Release
The series was published by Tokihara Masato in Kill Time Communication's Comic Unreal magazine in 2010.  Digital Manga announced their license to the book on 8 February 2013, with plans to publish it in North America under their Project-H imprint in June 2014.  In May 2014 they announced that one chapter would be removed from the print edition due to violent content.  They later stated that the chapter in question, "Game 4", would also be excluded from the digital edition, stating that the removal took place "mainly [because of] the shota aspect and the violence towards children."  After consulting with their legal expert, they were forced to contact the Japanese publisher and gain permission to remove the chapter for the volume's English release.

Reception
Reviewing Coffin of Cerebrum for The Fandom Post, Matthew Alexander gave the story and art a grade of A−.  He called the story "very appealing", citing the fact that the book represented the underrepresented category of "fantasy genre hentai stories".  He was also positive toward the art, calling it "perfect for a hentai story with a fantasy theme", and noting that the author "does a terrific job with anatomy and proportions".  He was critical, however, of the presence of censorship and of the quality of the English translation, writing that the editing was "on the poor side with lots of misspelled text and a few words missing letters."

References

External links
 

2010 manga
Dark fantasy anime and manga
Digital Manga Publishing titles
Hentai anime and manga
Seinen manga